The 2007 UIV Cup Rotterdam was held from 5  to 9 January 2007 in Rotterdam Ahoy Sportpaleis in Rotterdam. The event was scheduled together with the 2007 Six Days of Rotterdam. Eleven teams existing of under-23 riders challenged each other in a five-day madison event.

Day 1

Day 2

Day 3

Day 4

Day 5

Réne Schibli and Jorrit Walgien were injured and could not take part in the last race. As a result Kilian Moser and Thijs Bezemer rode together with the Schibli and Moser score.

External links
 Official website

UIV Cup Rotterdam
UIV Cup
2007 UIV Cup Rotterdam